Peter Karl Åslin (21 September 1962 – 19 January 2012) was a Swedish national team ice hockey goaltender.

Åslin started his international career by winning the IIHF World U20 Championship in 1981, which was Sweden's lone world junior gold for 31 years until the win in Calgary in 2012. Åslin won three Swedish championships; two with AIK of Stockholm in 1982 and 1984, and one with HV71 of Jönköping in 1995. He medalled in each of the four men's World Championships he participated in: gold medal in 1992 in Prague and three silver medals; in 1986, 1990 and 1993. Åslin won an Olympic bronze medal in Calgary in 1988.

Åslin played 91 national team games for Sweden. Married with children, Åslin died on 19 January 2012 in Leksand after having suffered multiple strokes.  He was 49.

References

1962 births
2012 deaths
AIK IF players
HV71 players
Ice hockey players at the 1988 Winter Olympics
Leksands IF players
Mora IK players
London Knights (UK) players
Medalists at the 1988 Winter Olympics
Olympic bronze medalists for Sweden
Olympic ice hockey players of Sweden
Olympic medalists in ice hockey
Oulun Kärpät players
People from Norrtälje
St. Louis Blues draft picks
Swedish ice hockey goaltenders
Sportspeople from Stockholm County